Michael Cole (born 1943) is a former BBC television journalist and royal correspondent. After leaving the BBC, he worked as director of public affairs for Harrods, and thus also as a spokesman for its owner Mohamed Al Fayed.

Journalism
Cole began his career in newspapers, before moving to television. After a period with the local news programme for Anglia Television, he worked on the BBC's Look East from the beginning of 1969. In 1973, he was one of the three correspondents sent by the BBC to cover the Yom Kippur War from the Israeli side, his first assignment after becoming permanently based in London following brief periods in Northern Ireland. The reforms brought about by former BBC Director General Hugh Greene benefited news coverage, according to Cole, but were accompanied by the heavy drug use of some BBC departments.

Cole covered Margaret Thatcher's career following her election as Conservative Party leader in 1975, told her on camera that Airey Neave had been assassinated in 1979, and was on hand at the rescue of Norman Tebbit after the Brighton's Grand Hotel was bombed by the IRA in 1984.

Cole inadvertently revealed to a press correspondent's lunch some of the 1987 Queen's Christmas message, apparently her reference to the Enniskillen bombing on Remembrance Day. According to Cole, he immediately told his employer what had happened, and found the "Cole the Mole" headlines which followed inappropriate. Cole's friend and fellow Royal reporter James Whitaker, later stated that Cole had spoken only in general terms and did not convey anything which was secret. Although the BBC apologised to the Queen for the lapse, Cole was not sacked, and was shifted to a media and arts remit, remaining with the corporation for another ten months.

Later career
Cole first met Mohamed Al Fayed while working on a BBC programme about the Duke and Duchess of Windsor, The Uncrowned Jewels in 1987. He joined Harrods after leaving the BBC in 1988, telling journalist Nick Cohen days after the death of Diana, Princess of Wales that he loved Al Fayed like a father, although he was a victim of bugging because his boss did not trust many of his employees. He stepped down in 1998 to take early retirement at the age of 55, but continued to work for Al Fayed.

In 2008, Cole gave evidence to the inquest into the deaths in 1997 of Diana, Princess of Wales and Dodi Fayed, Mohamed Al Fayed's son.

In 2012, he jointly delivered, with Vernon Bogdanor, a Commonwealth Parliamentary Association lecture, The Crown and the Commonwealth: An emblem of dominion or a symbol of free and voluntary association? at Westminster Hall, part of the Palace of Westminster.

He is the chair of Michael Cole & Company, his own public relations and broadcasting company. He has also written a column for the East Anglian Daily Times, and appeared in 1999 as a panellist on the BBC's satirical quiz, Have I Got News for You.

References

External links 
 Michael Cole & Company
 
 Prince Andrew's Wedding BBC History
 

1943 births
Living people
Place of birth missing (living people)
English journalists
BBC newsreaders and journalists
English public relations people
House of Fraser
Royal correspondents